Fargo North High School, more commonly known in the district as Fargo North or North High, is a public high school located in Fargo, North Dakota, United States. It currently serves over 900 students in grades 9–12 and is a part of the Fargo Public Schools system. The official school colors are navy blue and gold, and its mascot is the Spartans.

History

North High is the oldest existing high school in Fargo after its predecessor, Fargo Central High School, was destroyed in a fire in 1966. Over the following decades, the building was expanded several times. The most recent expansion was completed in 2006 when a new wing was added to the southeast part of the building to accommodate freshmen after Fargo Public Schools relocated them from the nearby Ben Franklin Jr. High School (now Ben Franklin Middle School).

Athletics

Fargo North is a part of the North Dakota High School Activities Association and has won championships in a number of sports:

Hockey-2012

Music
The music department of Fargo North consists of three concert bands, one jazz band, two concert choirs, one jazz choir, two concert orchestras, and one symphony orchestra.

Choir
There are four choirs offered at Fargo North: a treble choir (formerly known as the women's choir), a mixed choir, a concert choir, and the 19th Avenue Jazz Choir. The jazz choir is the only one joined by audition and also includes two sound technicians. Female freshmen take part in the treble choir, and female upperclassmen may as well if they so choose. The mixed choir features freshman boys and all sophomore students. The concert choir is where the majority of juniors and seniors sing. The choirs are conducted by Eric Saari.

Band
The band program is for all grades, with a mixed junior-senior band. There are two jazz bands, one by audition and the other open. Band students frequently participate in pep band during sporting events. The freshman, junior/senior, and audition jazz bands are conducted by Kelsey Dragosavich and the sophomore and open jazz bands are conducted by Greg Calrow.

Orchestra
There are three string orchestras: one featuring freshman, known as the Spartan orchestra, another for students in grades 10–12, known as the symphony orchestra, and an audition group for all grades, known as the chamber orchestra. The chamber orchestra rehearses on their own time after school hours as a small group of highly dedicated musicians. Occasionally, the orchestra is joined by band students playing woodwind, brass, percussion, and sometimes, although seldom, voice accompaniment from the choir. The orchestras are conducted by Greg Schultz.

Theatre
Fargo North Theatre activities include International Thespian Society Troupe #4561, a technical theatre crew, and Performing Arts classes. There are three main shows a year - a musical in the fall, a one-act play in the winter that also performs at the Fargo Area One-Act Festival, and a straight show in the spring. Fargo North also has an improv group called the Improvinati, which puts on performances monthly. Since 2004, the theatre department has been directed by Thomas Gillen.

Notable alumni
Danny Irmen - Professional hockey player
Cynthia Kierscht - US government official
Roxana Saberi – Former journalist ; former Miss North Dakota 1996; accused of espionage by Iran; Hall of Fame inductee, 1997
Jule Selbo – television writer
Timm Sharp – television actor
Ryan Lance - 3 time Emmy award winning musician/ The Blenders

References

External links

Public high schools in North Dakota
Education in Fargo–Moorhead
North Dakota High School Activities Association (Class A)
North Dakota High School Activities Association (Class AAA Football)
Schools in Cass County, North Dakota
Buildings and structures in Fargo, North Dakota